Jankoviči ( or ) is a settlement on the main road from Črnomelj to Adlešiči in the White Carniola area of southeastern Slovenia. It is made up of the hamlets of Rim, Šoštariči, Karaman, and Jankoviči. The area is part of the traditional region of Lower Carniola and is now included in the Southeast Slovenia Statistical Region.

References

External links
Jankoviči on Geopedia

Populated places in the Municipality of Črnomelj